Rudolf Pavlovich Povarnitsyn (born June 13, 1962 in Votkinsk, Udmurtia) is a retired athlete, who represented USSR and later Ukraine.

Career
Competing in the high jump, his greatest achievement was a bronze medal at the 1988 Summer Olympics for the USSR. His personal best jump of 2.40 metres, set in Donetsk, was also the world record from August 11 to September 4, 1985, when Igor Paklin beat it by one centimetre. Povarnitsyn's record is unique in that his personal best preceding his record setting competition was 2.26 m.

References

1962 births
Living people
People from Votkinsk
Ukrainian people of Russian descent
Olympic athletes of the Soviet Union
Olympic bronze medalists for the Soviet Union
Ukrainian male high jumpers
Soviet male high jumpers
Athletes (track and field) at the 1988 Summer Olympics
World record setters in athletics (track and field)
Medalists at the 1988 Summer Olympics
Olympic bronze medalists in athletics (track and field)
Universiade medalists in athletics (track and field)
Universiade bronze medalists for the Soviet Union
Medalists at the 1989 Summer Universiade